Katesan is a Tamil caste found in Tamil Nadu of India. They are chiefly found in the districts of Thirunelveli  of Tamil Nadu.

These are found in big temple, tanjavur and in other places. "Perumal Patamkatti" dating 900 AD was found in Kanyakumari.

They have seven exogamous sub-divisions known as Keelai. In the war between the Idangai and Valangai, the Katesans sided with the Kammalar who belonged to the Idangais. The Katesans lost the battle with only seven men standing. Each men took wife from different castes and thereby forming a subdivision. The following subdivisions are Kuttini (from a Kusuvar woman), Nēttali (from a Paravar woman), Attukkutti (from an Idaiyar woman), Thomba Puluvan (from a Thomban woman), Nayinan Chakravarthi (from a Panar woman), Kavadi (from a Shanar woman), and Tachilai (from a Vannar woman).

In the Katesan society, the maternal uncle's responsibility is more than the parents' responsibility.

Some of the Katesan of Tirunelveli,and Tuticorin were converted by St. Francis Xavier and other priests starting from 1536.

Their mangalsutra/thali worn during marriage are similar to Pillai. Their marriage customs find similarity with Brahmins and Pillais. With the passing of time, the Pattamkattiyars separated themselves from rest of the Pandiyan community and they formed an individual caste with their own customs. In this Ramanathapuram is explained because they belong to the fish spreading community not to be katesar community.

See also 

 Kadaiyar

References

Indian castes
Social groups of Tamil Nadu